John Rickard may refer to:
 John Rickard (civil servant), British civil servant and economic advisor
 John Rickard (economist), Australian economist
 John T. Rickard, mayor of Santa Barbara, California